Tanahashi (written: 棚橋 or 棚桥) is a Japanese surname. Notable people with the surname include:

, Japanese automotive engineer
, Japanese professional wrestler
, Japanese calligrapher, Zen teacher, writer and translator
, Japanese photographer
, Japanese politician
, Japanese footballer

Japanese-language surnames